Madagascar henipavirus (MadV) is a poorly characterized henipavirus type. Currently it has only been detected serologically among Madagascan rousettes. High cross reactivity was observed with Hendra and Nipah henipaviruses.

References

Henipavirus